The 2003 WAFL season was the 119th season of the various incarnations of the West Australian Football League. For this season the WAFL reverted briefly to playing its semi-finals as a “double-header”, a policy abandoned for good at the end of the 2005 season, and also reverted to a twenty-game home-and-away season with three byes which has continued to this day.

On the field, 2003 saw the end of East Perth's hat-trick of premierships as longtime rivals West Perth avenged their thrashing in the previous season's Grand Final, in the process becoming the first WAFL team to hold an opponent goalless since soon-defunct Midland Junction held West Perth themselves goalless in the opening round of 1916. Their Grand Final victims, Subiaco, were however to use this season as a springboard to the longest dynasty in the WA(N)FL since South Fremantle's famous teams of the late 1940s and early 1950s, with four consecutive minor premierships and five flags between 2003 and 2008. East Perth dominated the first two thirds of the season with the Falcons but after their goalless score they suffered major problems off the field and fell to third.

On the debit side, Peel Thunder, after three relatively promising seasons and the granting of a new five-year licence during April to secure their status in the WAFL, returned to rock bottom, losing their first seventeen matches and looking certain of a second winless season before an upset victory at Fremantle Oval against a South Fremantle team expected to break into a seemingly settled top four. They were not helped by the loss via transfer to East Fremantle after six games of their only competent forward in Scott Simister. The Sharks, historically the league's most successful club, sunk to a level not seen during the twentieth century owing to the loss due to injury and transfer of their regular ruck division, which left them critically short of height after David Dwyer fell injured in the fifth round. The blue and whites lead Peel by only one match for most of the year, and despite winning five of their last seven matches, East Fremantle were to win a mere nineteen of eighty matches between 2003 and 2006, the worst four consecutive seasons in their history.

Home-and-away season

Round 1

Round 2

Round 3

Round 4

Round 5 (Easter weekend)

Round 6

Round 7

Round 8

Round 9

Round 10

Round 11 (Foundation Day)

Round 12

Round 13

Round 14

Round 15

Round 16

Round 17

Round 18

Round 19

Round 20

Round 21

Round 22

Round 23

Ladder

Finals

Semi-finals

Preliminary final

Grand Final

Notes
A record of 23 wins and 61 losses between 1967 and 1970 is the only approach.
This “first full round” consisted of Rounds 2 to 10, during which the nine WAFL clubs played each other once.It was thought for a long time that Magro would replace the retiring Northey at his former club for the 2004 season.

References

External links
Official WAFL website
West Australian Football League (WAFL), 2003

West Australian Football League seasons
WAFL